Locksmith and Chancellor is a 1923 Soviet silent film directed by Vladimir Gardin based on the play of Anatoli Lunacharsky.

The film's art direction was by Vladimir Yegorov.

Synopsis
The Government of the fictional country Norland has unleashed a war with the neighboring Galikania and is suffering one defeat after another. A group of conspirators who were dissatisfied with this state of affairs, led by the Social Democrat Frank Frey arrange a coup to overthrew the emperor of Norland. But the working class does not like the new order either. Workers expose Frank Frey's policy of continuing the war and a revolution breaks out in the country. The leader of the socialist revolution becomes a mechanic of the name Franz Stark.

Cast
 Ivan Khudoleyev as Emperor of Norland
 Nikolai Panov as Chancellor von Turau  
 N. Tairova as von Turau's wife  
 Vladimir Gardin as Gammer  
 Vladimir Maksimov as Frank Frey, lawyer 
 Zoya Barantsevich as Countess Mitsi  
 Iona Talanov as Berenberg  
 Nikolai Saltykov as Franz Stark, locksmith 
 Lidiya Iskritskaya-Gardina  as Anna 
 Oleg Frelikh as Leo von Turau  
 Ivan Kapralov as Robert von Turau 
 V. Valitskaya as Lora von Turau, Robert's wife  
 Olga Bystritskaya as Anna, Leo's lover
 A. Semyonov as Netli, chancellor's secretary  
 M. Arnazi 
 Aleksandra Rebikova 
 Evgeniy Gryaznov 
 Karl Tomski 
 Nikolay Popov 
 Stepan Kuznetsov
 Olga Preobrazhenskaya

References

Bibliography 
 Sargeant, Amy. Vsevolod Pudovkin: Classic Films of the Soviet Avant-garde. I.B.Tauris, 2001.

External links 
 

1923 films
Soviet speculative fiction films
Soviet silent feature films
1920s Russian-language films
Films directed by Vladimir Gardin
Soviet black-and-white films
1920s speculative fiction films